Visitations is the fourth album by indie rock band Clinic, released on 16 October 2006 on Domino. The video for the single "Harvest (Within You)" was a featured video on YouTube.

Track listing
"Family" – 3:14
"Animal/Human" – 2:19
"Gideon" – 3:15
"Harvest (Within You)" – 3:23
"Tusk" – 1:47
"Paradise" – 3:06
"Children of Kellogg" – 3:40
"If You Could Read Your Mind" – 2:59
"Jigsaw Man" – 2:33
"Interlude" – 0:25
"The New Seeker" – 3:00
"Visitations" – 3:01

Singles
"Tusk" (7 February 2006 – free download-only single, available for a limited time at clinicvoot.org)
"Harvest" (2 October 2006)
"If You Could Read Your Mind" (5 February 2007)

Personnel

Ade Blackburn – keyboard, melodica, lead vocals
Brian Campbell – bass, flute, backing vocals
Hartley – lead guitar, clarinet, keyboards
Carl Turney – drums, piano, backing vocals, additional percussion

References

External links 
 Clinic live at ATP 2006 – features live performances of Visitations tracks.
 "Tusk" video at clinicvoot.org

2006 albums
Clinic (band) albums
Domino Recording Company albums